Ragnar Jändel (13 April 1895, Blekinge – 6 May 1939, Ronneby) was a Swedish poet and writer. He was of proletarian origin and one of the Swedish labor poets. His autobiographical writing Childhood paints a bleak picture of working-class family life. Partly because of a religious tone in his lyrics, he was expelled from the newspapers Brand and Stormklockan by more dogmatic left-wing socialists. One of his poems from this period was proposed by Fabian Månsson for inclusion in the 1937 hymnal.

References

1895 births
1939 deaths
Swedish poets
Swedish male poets
20th-century Swedish poets
20th-century Swedish male writers